The Great Gatsby is a 1926 American silent drama film directed by Herbert Brenon. It was the first film adaptation of the 1925 novel of the same name by F. Scott Fitzgerald. Warner Baxter portrayed Jay Gatsby and Lois Wilson portrayed Daisy Buchanan. The film was produced by Famous Players-Lasky, and distributed by Paramount Pictures. The Great Gatsby is now considered lost. A vintage movie trailer displaying short clips of the film still exists.

Plot 
The film is an adaptation of F. Scott Fitzgerald's novel where Midwesterner Nick Carraway is lured into the lavish world of his Long Island neighbor, Jay Gatsby. Soon, however, Carraway sees through the cracks of Gatsby's nouveau riche existence, where obsession, madness, and tragedy await.

The film's plot diverges from Fitzgerald's novel in several key respects: Daisy renounces Gatsby when she learns he is a bootlegger as opposed to when he demands she declare that she never loved Tom. Daisy also attempts to confess publicly to killing Myrtle Wilson but fails to do so. She later departs New York City with her husband Tom prior to Gatsby's murder by George Wilson and, consequently, Daisy has no knowledge of Gatsby's death. The final shot of the film shows "Daisy and her husband Tom and their tot draped beautifully on the porch of their happy home."

Cast 

Warner Baxter as Jay Gatsby
Lois Wilson as Daisy Buchanan
Neil Hamilton as Nick Carraway
Georgia Hale as Myrtle Wilson
William Powell as George Wilson
Hale Hamilton as Tom Buchanan
Carmelita Geraghty as Jordan Baker
George Nash as Charles Wolf
Eric Blore as Lord Digby
Gunboat Smith as Bert
Claire Whitney as Catherine
Claude Brooke - Uncredited role
Nancy Kelly - Uncredited role

Production 
The screenplay was written by Becky Gardiner and Elizabeth Meehan and was based on Owen Davis' stage play treatment of The Great Gatsby. The play, directed by George Cukor, opened on Broadway at the Ambassador Theatre on February 2, 1926. Shortly after the play opened, Famous Players-Lasky and Paramount Pictures purchased the film rights for $45,000.

The film's director Herbert Brenon designed The Great Gatsby as lightweight, popular entertainment, playing up the party scenes at Gatsby's mansion and emphasizing their scandalous elements. The film had a running time of 80 minutes, or 7,296 feet.

Reception

Film critics 
Mordaunt Hall—The New York Times''' first regular film critic—wrote in a contemporary review that the film was "good entertainment, but at the same time it is obvious that it would have benefited by more imaginative direction." He lamented that Herbert Brenon's direction lacked subtlety and that none of the actors convincingly developed their characters. He faulted a scene where Daisy gulps absinthe: "She takes enough of this beverage to render the average person unconscious. Yet she appears only mildly intoxicated, and soon recovers." Hall also describes a scene in which Gatsby "tosses twenty-dollar gold pieces into the [swimming pool] water, and you see a number of the girls diving for the coins. A clever bit of comedy is introduced by a girl asking what Gatsby is throwing into the water, and as soon as this creature hears that they are real gold pieces she unhesitatingly plunges into the pool to get a share. Gatsby appears to throw the money into the water with a good deal of interest, whereas it might perhaps have been more effective to have him appear a little bored as he watched the scramble of the men and women."

In contrast to Hall's mixed review, journalist Abel Green's November 1926 review published in Variety was more positive. Green deemed Brenon's production to be "serviceable film material" and "a good, interesting gripping cinema exposition of the type certain to be readily acclaimed by the average fan, with the usual Long Island parties and the rest of those high-hat trimmings thrown in to clinch the argument." Presumably in reaction to Daisy Buchanan rejecting Gatsby when she discovers that he is a bootlegger,  the Variety reviewer wryly observed that Gatsby's "Volstead violating" bootlegging was not "a heinous crime despite the existence of a federal statute which declares it so." The reviewer praised Warner Baxter's portrayal of Gatsby and Neil Hamilton's portrayal of Nick Carraway but found Lois Wilson's interpretation of Daisy to be needlessly unsympathetic.

 Fitzgeralds 

Although the film received generally positive reviews from critics, novelist F. Scott Fitzgerald purportedly loathed Brenon's cinematic adaptation of his novel. While living in a Los Angeles bungalow with his wife Zelda Sayre in early 1927, the couple viewed the film at a nearby theater and walked out midway through the screening. "We saw The Great Gatsby at the movies," Zelda later wrote to their daughter Scottie and her nanny. "It's ROTTEN and awful and terrible and we left."

 Civic groups 
Following the release of the film, women's civic groups—such as the Better Films Board of the Women's Council—lodged letters of protest to the studio and producers in December 1926. The women objected that the film depicted Daisy Buchanan having sexual relations with Gatsby prior to marriage and that Tom Buchanan was shown engaging in extramarital sex with Myrtle.

The civic group declared that, although "some homes are not sacred, some women not pure and some men not clean," it was nonetheless morally wrong "in the name of amusement to portray stories of this undesirable life, to hold it up before the theater going public for the [morally] weak to become interested in." They demanded that future motion pictures depict "the decent, clean American life, which if our nation is to stand, must remain clean and decent as it was at the beginning of our Republic."

 Preservation status 

Professor Wheeler Winston Dixon, the James Ryan Professor of Film Studies at the University of Nebraska, Lincoln made extensive but unsuccessful attempts to find a surviving print. Dixon noted that there were rumors that a copy survived in an unknown archive in Moscow but dismissed these rumors as unfounded. However, the trailer has survived and is one of the 50 films in the three-disc, boxed DVD set More Treasures from American Film Archives, 1894-1931 (2004), compiled by the National Film Preservation Foundation from five American film archives. The trailer is preserved by the Library of Congress (AFI/Jack Tillmany collection) and has a running time of one minute. It was featured on the Blu-ray released by Warner Home Video of director Baz Luhrmann's 2013 adaptation of The Great Gatsby'' as a special feature.

Gallery

References

Notes

Citations

Bibliography

External links 

 
 

Films based on The Great Gatsby
1926 drama films
1926 films
Silent American drama films
American silent feature films
American black-and-white films
Famous Players-Lasky films
Films directed by Herbert Brenon
Lost American films
Paramount Pictures films
1926 lost films
Lost drama films
1920s American films